Mascarenichthys is a genus of viviparous brotulas. They have mostly been collected from the region of Mascarene Plateau in the Indian Ocean and this is referred to in their generic name.

Species
There are currently three recognized species in this genus:
 Mascarenichthys heemstrai Schwarzhans & Møller, 2007
 Mascarenichthys microphthalmus Schwarzhans & Møller, 2007
 Mascarenichthys remotus Schwarzhans & Møller, 2011

References

Bythitidae